The Alabama Hammers were a professional indoor football team based in Huntsville, Alabama. The team played in the Professional Indoor Football League (PIFL) from 2012 to 2015. The Hammers originally began play as an expansion team in the Southern Indoor Football League in 2011. The Hammers are the fourth indoor football team to play at the Von Braun Center; these were the Alabama Vipers of the AFL (2010), the Tennessee Valley Vipers of the af2 (2000–2004 and 2006–2009), and the Tennessee Valley Raptors of the United Indoor Football league (2005). The owner of the Hammers is Southern Sports Entertainment, LLC. The Hammers play their home games at the Von Braun Center. Their name comes from the Yellowhammer, the state bird of Alabama.

Franchise history

2011
On November 5, 2010, it was announced that indoor football was to stay at the Von Braun Center in the form of the Alabama Hammers who would be playing in the Southern Indoor Football League (SIFL). The nickname "Hammers" was chosen due to the state bird of Alabama being the yellowhammer. On December 19, 2010, the Hammers announced that Marty Hammond, who had coached the Rio Grande Valley Dorados from 2006 to 2009, as their first ever head coach. On March 19, 2011, the Hammers took the field for their first ever game as a franchise, losing 20–67 to the Columbus Lions. The Hammers achieved the first victory in forfeit fashion, as the Mobile Bay Tarpons forfeited their April 29 game. The Hammers finished the regular season with a 4–8 record, failing to qualify for the postseason.

2012
Before the season began, the Hammers joined the Professional Indoor Football League after the Southern Indoor Football League dissolved. The Hammers went 3–9 in 2012, failing to making the playoffs.

2013

For the 2013 season, the Hammers hired former Alabama Vipers coach Dean Cokinos to be their head coach.
The Hammers have achieved the level of success expected of coach Cokinos, who has a great winning percentage in lower level indoor football. They won their first championship when they won the PIFL title over the Richmond Raiders 70–44.

2014

The Hammers did not return to their championship form in 2014, losing their first 4 games of the regular season. After the Hammers seemed to have righted the ship with 3-straight wins, they went on another 4-game losing streak. The Hammers finished the season 4–8, tied for 4th placed in the American Conference, failing to qualify for the playoffs.

2015

During the offseason, Cokinos took a job as the head coach of the New Orleans VooDoo of the Arena Football League. He was replaced with Cosmo Dematteo, who had coached the filler team, Georgia Fire in 2014. However, in January 2015, Dematteo stepped down due to family issues before coaching a game for the Hammers. Scott Sharp was named the new Hammers' head coach on January 27, 2015.

In 2015, the Hammers folded upon the league folding.

Players

Final roster

Awards and honors
The following is a list of all Hammers players who won league awards:

Head coaches

Coaching staff

Season-by-season results

References

External links 
 

 
2010 establishments in Alabama
2015 disestablishments in Alabama